Siji Kaiyuan Hotel was a hotel in Songling, Suzhou, Jiangsu, China. On 12 July 2021, an annex to the hotel collapsed due to illegal construction, killing 17 people and injuring another five.

Background 
Nearby merchants said that the collapsed building was very old and was being renovated. The first floor was the main hall, which was used to open a hotel, and the second and third floors were used for accommodation.

Collapse 
At 15:33 on 12 July 2021, an annex to the Siji Kaiyuan Hotel suddenly collapsed.

Rescue  
After the collapse, Jiangsu Fire Brigade sent six heavy rescue teams, five light rescue teams, five search and rescue dogs, more than 120 fire engines and 650 soldiers to rescue the victims. Lou Qinjian, party chief of CPC Jiangsu Provincial Committee, and Wu Zhenglong, governor of Jiangsu, issued instructions, demanding scientific organization of search and rescue, full treatment of the wounded, minimizing casualties and preventing secondary disasters. Wu Zhenglong,  and the main leaders of Suzhou and Wujiang District rushed to the scene to organize and command the rescue at the first time. The Ministry of Emergency Management and Ministry of Housing and Urban-Rural Development send working groups to the scene to guide the rescue work.

On July 13, Lou Qinjian, the top political position in the province, rushed to the scene to command rescue and disposal work.

At 9:00 on July 14, the search and rescue work ended. A total of 23 people were rescued, one of them returned home uninjured, five were injured and 17 were killed.

Investigation 
A preliminary investigation found the collapse was caused by the owner altering the structure of the building. On 13 July 2021, the actual controller of the hotel has been taken away for investigation by local police.

See also 
 Collapse of Xinjia Express Hotel - A similar collapse in 2020 resulting from illegal construction-induced overloading.
 Collapse of Juxian Restaurant

References 

2021 disasters in China
Building collapses in 2021
Building collapses in China
Coordinates not on Wikidata
Disasters in hotels
History of Suzhou
July 2021 events in China
Disasters in Jiangsu